The Prince's Trust is a charity in the United Kingdom founded in 1976 by King Charles III (then Prince of Wales) to help vulnerable young people get their lives on track. It supports 11-to-30-year-olds who are unemployed or struggling at school and at risk of exclusion. Many of the young people helped by the trust face issues such as homelessness, mental health problems, or trouble with the law.

It runs a range of training programmes, providing practical and financial support to build young people's confidence and motivation. Each year they work with about 60,000 young people, with three in four moving on to employment, education, volunteering, or training.

In 1999, the numerous trust charities were brought together as the Prince's Trust and acknowledged by Queen Elizabeth II at a ceremony in Buckingham Palace where she granted it a royal charter. The following year it devolved in Wales, Scotland, Northern Ireland, and other English regions but overall control remained in London. The Prince's Trust fundraising and campaign events are often hosted by and feature entertainers from around the world. In April 2011 the youth charity Fairbridge became part of the trust. In 2015, Prince's Trust International was launched to collaborate with other charities and organisations in other countries (mostly Commonwealth nations) to help young people in those countries.

The Prince's Trust is one of the most successful funding organisations in the UK and is the UK's leading youth charity, having helped over 1,000,000 young people turn their lives around, created 125,000 entrepreneurs, and given business support to 395,000 people in the UK. From 2006 to 2016, its work for the youth has been worth an estimated £1.4 billion.

In 2019, the Prince's Trust signed a partnership with the Department of Health and Social Care to support 10,000 young people (16-to-30-year-olds) into health and social care jobs. This initiative aims to future-proof the sector, provide employment opportunities to young people, and support the department's "widening participation" goals, increasing the diversity of its workforce.

Purpose 
The trust has its primary objective defined in its royal charter as follows:

Target groups 
The Prince's Trust aims to work with young people aged 11 to 30. The goal is to assist them in moving into work, education, or training.

Governance

Charles III founded The Prince's Trust and is now its president, a figurehead position with no legal responsibility. The Prince's Trust Council are the trustees of the charity and are legally responsible for management, administration and deciding policy.

John Booth was announced as the chairman of The Prince's Trust Council in July 2018 and Sir Lloyd Dorfman CBE, who previously held this position, became the chairman of Prince's Trust International.

Nick Stace, the former chief executive of The Trust, joined in October 2017, replacing Dame Martina Milburn DCVO CBE who was a member of the Board and Group Chief Executive for The Prince's Trust. At the end of 2019, Jonathan Townsend took over as Interim CEO - a position made permanent in spring 2020.

Staff
In 2019 the Prince's Trust employed 1241 people including 1106 people who worked in charitable purposes and support, and 235 in fundraising. The cost of employing these staff is £38 million a year and is the organisation's single biggest expenditure.

Martina Milburn, former Chief Executive of the Prince's Trust Group (covering the UK, Australia, Canada, New Zealand, United States and International), who joined The Trust in 2004 and was appointed Group Chief Executive in 2017, stepped down from this role in September 2022. Previously she worked as the Chief Executive of BBC Children in Need.

Will Straw CBE was appointed Chief Executive Officer of Prince's Trust International  in summer 2020.

Ambassadors
The Prince's Trust consist of different kinds of Ambassadors:

The first are young ambassadors, these are young leaders who are volunteers and support the Prince's Trust in different ways including motivating other young people and winning contributors and the media about the work the Prince's Trust do.

The second are job ambassadors. These group have taken part in a Prince's Trust programme and have graduated from being a Young Ambassador. They are then employed by the Prince's Trust and work to inspire, motive and assist the young people in fulfilling the programmes they enrol in.

Lastly, there are celebrity ambassadors who help raise awareness of the work that is done by the Prince's Trust in young people's lives. Celebrity ambassadors also involve themselves by visiting the young people during courses and programmes, host and help fundraising events and additionally start and support campaigns for the Prince's Trust. Current Celebrity Ambassadors include: Phil Collins, Phillip Schofield, Gary Lineker, Jeremy Irons, Tom Hardy, Geri Halliwell, Benedict Cumberbatch, Idris Elba, Gemma Arterton and Sharon Osbourne.

In 2017, the Prince's Trust recruited Tom Fletcher and Giovanna Fletcher as the charity's first Digital Celebrity Ambassadors, following the great support they had given following their attendance at our Celebrate Success Awards.

Subsidiaries 
The trust has five charitable subsidiaries, each of which has its own board of trustees: Prince's Trust International, Prince's Trust Australia, Prince's Trust Canada, Prince's Trust New Zealand, and Prince's Trust America.

In 2019, Prince's Trust International also operated in Barbados, Greece, India, Jamaica, Jordan, Malta and Pakistan.

The trust also has one non-charitable subsidiary, Prince's Trust Trading Limited, which is responsible for the trust's commercial activities.

Finances
In 2009–10 the Prince's Trust charity, and its trading subsidiary, Prince's Trust Trading Ltd, had a total income of nearly £36 million, and expenditure of £38 million. Facing the impact of the economic climate and a decline in funding it drew on its reserves, which stand at £22 million, representing roughly six months operating costs. The Prince's Trust is one of the 100 largest charities in the UK ranked by expenditure.

Income
Voluntary income represented the largest source of funding for the organisation, totalling £18 million in 2009–10 (representing a very small increase on 2008–09. Public Sector income (contracts and grants to deliver support to young people from statutory bodies) fell from £17 million to just under £14 million. The cost of raising the voluntary income was £5.5 million, which means that for every £1 donated, 70p was spent on charitable activities.

For the past ten years, its work is reported to be worth an estimated £1.4billion.

Expenditure
The Prince's Trust expenditure of £38.2 million was made up of £30 million spent on charitable activities with the rest being spent on administration and other costs. The £30 million spent on charitable activities was divided between the different programme areas such as the Team programme and the Enterprise programme. £1.2 million went on grants to young people and institutions.

Charitable activities
The Prince's Trust has seven main types of charitable activity.
 The Enterprise programme helps young people start a business.
 The Team Programme is a 12-week personal development course, offering work experience, practical skills, community projects and a residential week.
 Get intos are short courses offering training and experience in a specific sector to help young people get a job.
 Get Starteds are short courses that give people the chance to take part in a week of activities to grow their confidence and skills. 
 Fairbridge offers a mix of group activities and one-to-one support for young people. 
 Development Awards are small monetary grants given to young people to help them get some training, education or a job.
 Achieve clubs are held in schools, or through the Trust's centres for those outside of education.
 Mosaic runs programmes in primary and secondary schools to link young people with role models to boost their confidence.

Enterprise programme
The Enterprise programme is the offer for which the Prince's Trust is best known for. Helping young people to become their own boss by starting a business, 18 to 30-year-olds are given practical, mentoring and financial support of up to £5,000.

As part of the programme, each young person is appointed a business mentor who provide one-to-one support for up to two years to develop and grow their business, acting as a sounding board to share thoughts and concerns, as well as empowering them to make their own decisions.

The Prince's Trust has helped 86,845 young people to set up in business since 1983.

The Prince's Trust offers Enterprise Online, to enable 18 to 30-year-olds to explore becoming their own boss, learning at their own pace with dedicated support along the way. From developing quick pitches to get investors interested in your business to marketing strategy advice to bring in sales, it has everything young people need – including access to mentors to help them achieve their goals.

Team programme
Team is a 12-week personal development programme which gives young people that are NEET (not in education, employment or training) and aged 16–25 the chance to gain new skills, complete a qualification and meet new people through team-building activities, a residential trip, community project and work placement. The course is usually run by a local organisation known as the delivery partner.

205,063 young people have participated in the 12-week Team programme since its launch in 1990. 

The people going on Team are usually unemployed, and if they are receiving Jobseekers' Allowance and other benefits they are still able to receive these whilst on the course. People going on the course also get their travel expenses and other costs paid. Some people in employment also go on part of a course but their employer has to pay a course fee of £1,250 to the Prince's Trust. The Prince's Trust employs fundraisers with "proven sales experience" to persuade employers to pay for their employees to go on the Prince's Trust Team Course. In 2006/7 the Prince's Trust received nearly £687,000 from employer's fees for Team courses.

As part of the programme participants go on a trip to an outbound activity centre where they focus on communication, teamwork and confidence building. Later in the programme they work on their Maths and English skills, and give back to their local community by volunteering, raising awareness and fundraising for causes that matter to them. Participants also complete a two-week work experience placement.

Get into
Get intos are short courses that give young people experience and training in a specific sector, to allow them to gain employability skills to move into work. Focus industries include retail, rail, construction, logistics and hospitality.

In 2017, The Prince's Trust launched Employability Online, to enable 18 to 30-year-olds to gain the essential skills they need to secure the job they want. From understanding what job is right for you to tips on making your CV stand out, it has everything young people need – including access to e-mentors to help them achieve their goals.

Get Started
Get Started s are short courses that give young people the chance to take part in a week of activities that allow them to develop skills with help from industry experts. Working with partners including the Premier League, ASOS and Sony, they work towards a group challenge while developing skills and confidence.

Fairbridge
The Fairbridge programme offers group activities and one-to-one support for young people to develop skills and confidence. It starts with a five-day Access course delivered from one of The Trust's 18 centres across the UK, and includes a residential trip.

Once the Access course is complete, young people choose from a range of activities, from sports to drama and photography to cooking, to help them reach their goals.

In 2016, L’Oréal Paris partnered with the Prince's Trust to develop a confidence training course for the Fairbridge programme, covering relationships, body language and employability.

Achieve programme
The Prince's Trust education programme, Achieve (formerly known as xl clubs) provides young people at risk of underachieving and exclusion the chance to try new activities to boost their confidence, while gaining a recognised qualification.

Delivered in schools, youth centres, pupil referral units, youth offender institutions and Prince's Trust centres, the course allows young people to explore personal and social development; life skills; active citizenship; enterprise; and skills to prepare them for work.

In 2006/7 the Prince's Trust spent £4 million on the xl programme and of this £298,000 consisted of grants to clubs, £1.26 million was spent on Prince's Trust staff costs and £2.3 million on other direct costs and support costs.

Development Awards
The Prince's Trust Development Awards remove young people's financial barriers to enable them to take the next step into work, education or training. Covering course fees, transport or equipment, eligible young people can receive up to £500.

Mosaic Mentoring
Mosaic moved into the Prince's Trust in April 2016. Its programmes – which run in primary and secondary schools and prisons and include an Enterprise challenge competition – aim to bridge the aspirations-attainment gap by linking young people with inspirational role models and helping boost their confidence, self-efficacy and long-term employability.

Future Leaders 
The Future Leaders programme gives young people the foundations of leadership and teamwork. The programme was launched by  Prince's Trust Goodwill Ambassador Gareth Southgate in May 2019.

Get Hired 
Get Hired is a monthly recruitment event run by The Trust. At each event, up to 20 employers with live entry-level vacancies do ten-minute interviews with candidates.

The Jason Kanabus Fund 
The Jason Kanabus Fund was created from the £2.5 million left to the Prince's Trust by Jason Kanabus, a young farmer in Sussex who died from cancer in July 2006. He left his money to the Prince's Trust, with the request that the income was used to help young people become established in farming.

Awards

The Prince's Trust celebrates the achievements of young people each year through its Prince's Trust Awards (formerly known as Celebrate Success Awards).

Sponsored by TK Maxx and HomeSense, these series of awards events are an opportunity to pay tribute to the bravery, determination and sheer hard work that the young people demonstrate. The process begins each summer when staff, volunteers, partners and supporters nominate the exceptional young people they've met. In each of the regions and countries, judging panels select finalists in seven award categories.

Throughout the autumn The Trust holds 11 Oscar-style regional award ceremonies across the country before hosting a national final in London where the red carpet is rolled out.

Hosted by Ant and Dec and attended by a range of celebrity ambassadors, including Thierry Henry, Gemma Arterton and Emilia Fox, it recognises the Young Achiever of the Year, Young Ambassador of the Year and many more. And since 2022, it airs on ITV

Generating income
The Prince's Trust obtains money from two main sources. Firstly, there is the income received as a result of the charitable activities it undertakes, and secondly it raises voluntary income. 87p in every £1 donated to the Prince's Trust is spent on charitable activities.

Income from charitable activities
This totalled nearly £16 million in 2007/8 and was mostly contract payments for courses, training, mentoring and other services. Of the £16 million, nearly £2 million came from local and national government, over £9 million from other public sector sources, nearly £4 million from the European Union and £753,000 from the Community Fund.

The "other" public sector sources included:

Regional Dev. Agencies (One North East) £775,000
East Midlands Development Agency £730,000
The Big Lottery Fund £660,000
Department for Education & Skills £158,000

It is unclear how much money in total came from the European Union (EU), as although some money (£4 million) is declared as coming directly, other money can be channelled indirectly through other organisations. Previously much of the EU money for the Prince's Trust came from the European Social Fund (ESF) and could only be spent to help young people who are Not in Education, Employment or Training (NEET). Some of the ESF money went directly to the Prince's Trust (£816,000 2006/7), but mostly it went to the Learning and Skills Council (LSC) who "doubled it up" with government money that then had the same restrictions placed on it. Some LSC money was given directly to the Prince's Trust (£1.3 million 2006/7) but the majority went to the regional LSC offices who took out contracts with the regional Prince's Trust offices to provide services for unemployed young people. The ESF money was channelled through so many routes it is difficult to determine how much it amounted to, but in 2006 the funding provided by the LSC to the Prince's Trust in total came to approximately £11 million, although clearly these figures have decreased somewhat in recent years.

Voluntary income
The voluntary income raised in 2007-8 was more than £20 million, consisting of £5.2 million from charitable trusts, £4.7 million in corporate donations, £4.5 in individual donations and £2.1 million donations in kind.

Individual donations
Leadership Groups are an important part of the trust's fundraising from individuals. These groups are made up of successful (i.e. rich) individuals within certain business sectors, such as the Technology and Construction sectors. The aim with these groups is that the individuals not only give donations, but also that they encourage employee donations and volunteering from within their organisations.

Fundraising events
The trust still has some fundraising events, including a Rock Gala that aired on 25 December 2010 on DirecTV. In 2012, the Prince's Trust was one of the main beneficiaries of Bob Finch and Michael Holland's Oil Aid.

The Prince's Trust Group
The Prince's Trust Group's mission is to transform lives and build sustainable communities across the world. Together, the group of Prince's Trust charities will support around 90,000 people during 2019–20. 

Established in 2018, the Prince's Trust Group includes the work of The Prince's Trust in the UK alongside a group of charities including: Prince’s Trust International, Prince’s Trust Australia, Prince’s Trust New Zealand, Prince’s Trust Canada and most recently Prince's Trust USA. Through the Prince's Trust Group young people are supported to access education, employment and self-employment in Australia, Barbados, Canada, Greece, India, Jordan, Malta, New Zealand and Pakistan. During 2019–20, Prince's Trust Group will start supporting young people in Ghana, Kenya, Rwanda, Trinidad & Tobago, Jamaica and Malaysia. 

His Highness The Aga Khan is the Global Founding Patron of the Prince's Trust Group. American singer and songwriter, Lionel Richie, is the founding Global Ambassador and Chairman of the Global Ambassador Group.

Timeline

Impact in the United Kingdom and beyond
Additionally, The Prince's Trust has helped more than 90,000 young people to set up in business since 1983. The outcome of the fund's activities has been studied by many groups. A study by Meager et al in 2006 found

Collaboration with artists 
The Prince's Trust has worked with artists such as:
 1982: Status Quo, Jethro Tull, Madness, Pete Townshend, Phil Collins, Robert Plant, Kate Bush, Midge Ure, Mick Karn, Gary Brooker
 1985: Dire Straits
 1986: Big Country, David Bowie, Mick Jagger, Elton John, Eric Clapton, Howard Jones, Joan Armatrading, Level 42, Mark Knopfler, Midge Ure, Paul McCartney, Paul Young, Phil Collins, Rod Stewart, Suzanne Vega, Tina Turner, Sting, Ray Cooper
 1987: Alison Moyet, Ben E. King, Bryan Adams, Curiosity Killed the Cat, Elton John, Eric Clapton, George Harrison, Go West, Labi Siffre, Level 42, Midge Ure, Phil Collins, Ringo Starr, Tony Hadley, Jeff Lynne, Ray Cooper
 1988: Bee Gees, Black, Elton John, Eric Clapton, Howard Jones, Joe Cocker, Leonard Cohen, Mark Knopfler, Midge Ure, Peter Gabriel, Phil Collins, Rick Astley, T'Pau, Wet Wet Wet, Brian May
 1989: Joan Baez, Andy Bell, Beverley Brown, City of Birmingham Symphony Orchestra, Will Downing, John Farnham, Tony Hadley, Nigel Kennedy, Nichola Kerr, Level 42, Ladysmith Black Mambazo, Mike + The Mechanics, Van Morrison, Anne Nightingale, Alexander O'Neal, Mica Paris, Dashiell Rae, Swing Out Sister
 1990: Wet Wet Wet, Big Country, Roachford, Lenny Kravitz, And Why Not, Moody Blues, Pasadenas, The Chimes, Oleta Adams, Taylor Dayne, Chaka Khan, Lisa Stansfield
 2014: Beyoncé
 2017: Cheryl Cole
 2018: Muse

See also

 The Prince's Charities
 Party in the Park

References

External links

 Official website of the Prince's Trust
 Prince's Trust YouTube channel Flash Video player required.
 
 Success Stories at The Prince's Trust Website

 
Organisations based in the City of London
Organizations established in 1976
Social welfare charities based in the United Kingdom
1976 establishments in the United Kingdom
The Prince's Charities
International charities